Byron Dean Tolson (born November 25, 1951) is an American former professional basketball player. Tolson played three seasons for the Seattle SuperSonics of the National Basketball Association (NBA). He played college basketball for the Arkansas Razorbacks.

Professional career
Tolson was selected by the Seattle SuperSonics in the 5th round (8th pick, 80th overall) of the 1974 NBA draft, after completing his career at the University of Arkansas.  He played three seasons for the SuperSonics, appearing in 80 games over his career.

Tolson was also selected in the 7th round of the 1974 American Basketball Association Draft by the New York Nets.

Following his NBA career, Tolson played eleven years internationally before returning to school to complete his education at the University of Arkansas.

He played for Greek club AEK B.C. in the 1983–84 FIBA Korać Cup.

References

1951 births
Living people
American expatriate basketball people in Greece
American expatriate basketball people in the Philippines
American men's basketball players
Anchorage Northern Knights players
Arkansas Razorbacks men's basketball players
Basketball players from Kansas City, Missouri
Greek Basket League players
Philippine Basketball Association imports
Power forwards (basketball)
Rochester Zeniths players
Seattle SuperSonics draft picks
Seattle SuperSonics players